HMS Speedy (P296) was a Boeing Jetfoil, latterly a  mine countermeasure vessel, of the Royal Navy, based on the civilian Boeing 929 design.   She was procured in 1979, as the first of a planned class of twelve, to provide the Royal Navy with practical experience in the operation of a hydrofoil, to ascertain technical and performance characteristics, and to oversee the capability of such a craft in the Fishery Protection Squadron and North Sea Squadron.  She was assigned to these squadrons in September 1981. In 1982, she was used in minesweeping and minelaying trials at Portsmouth, but these were unsuccessful and she was sold into mercantile service in 1986. As of 2019, she is serving as a high speed ferry between Hong Kong and Macau, under the name Lilau.

See also
 , a United States Navy class of hydrofoil fast attack patrol boats.

References
Notes

Bibliography

External links
  

Boeing hydrofoils
1979 ships
Ships built in Seattle
Ships of the Fishery Protection Squadron of the United Kingdom